The Diepholz Moor Depression has a total area of around 105,000 ha and incorporates numerous smaller and larger nature reserves and protected landscapes. The region includes 24,000 ha of raised bogs (geological definition), divides into 15 raised bogs, as well as the Dümmer and its depression in the southwest.

Location 
The Diepholz Moor Depression lies within the triangle formed by the cities of Bremen, Osnabrück and Hanover, predominantly within the state of Lower Saxony with a small part in the state of North Rhine Westphalia. It is a shallow sandy valley depression on the southern perimeter of the North German Plain with only a few, more prominent geest ridges.

External links 
 BUND Diepholzer Moorniederung
  beim BUND Niedersachsen
  beim Niedersächsischen Umweltministerium
 Bildergalerie einer privaten, nichtkommerziellen Website
 Das Wietingsmoor in der Diepholzer Moorniederung

References 

Bird reserves in Germany
Ramsar sites in Germany
North German Plain
Bogs of Lower Saxony
Nature reserves in Lower Saxony
Diepholz (district)